Ranón is one of five parishes (administrative divisions) in Soto del Barco, a municipality within the province and autonomous community of Asturias, in northern Spain.

The postal code is 33459.

Parishes in Soto del Barco